The Sprint Showdown and Sprint All-Star Race XXIV were run on Saturday, May 17, 2008, at Lowe's Motor Speedway in Concord, North Carolina, a suburb outside of Charlotte. The events were telecast live at 7 pm US EDT on Speed Channel with radio broadcast on MRN Radio and Sirius Satellite Radio beginning at 6:15 pm US EDT.

The All-Star Race is an annual race that involves winners of the entire 2007 and 2008 NASCAR Sprint Cup Series races (known as the Nextel Cup Series in 2007) through the Dodge Challenger 500, either as a driver or team owner, and also includes past championship drivers of the Winston/Nextel Cup series from 1998 through 2007, as well as winning drivers from 2000 to 2007, known through this period as either "The Winston" or the "Nextel All-Star Challenge".

Eligible 2008 drivers

NOTE: Only the driver's first accomplishment is listed, as most of those drivers listed have attained more than one of the previously mentioned accomplishments to qualify.  All former All-Star Race winners are referenced by the current use of the Roman Numeral designation.  For example, Ryan Newman won All-Star Race XVIII, but he also won the 2008 Daytona 500. Sprint Cup champions of the past ten years, winners of Sprint All-Star Races XIV through XXIII, and all race winners (driver and owner) from the 2007 Daytona 500 through the 2008 Dodge Challenger 500 have exemptions into the race, as will the top two finishing drivers in the Sprint Showdown as well as the fan vote winner from said Showdown.

The following drivers were eligible:

+ – Dale Jarrett is retiring after the 2008 Food City 500 marking his final driving appearance.

§ – Dale Earnhardt Jr. is eligible as a past All-Star Race winner as a driver, while the No. 8 team is also eligible as Mark Martin, a past All-Star Race winner, is scheduled to drive in this race.

± – Kyle Busch and Casey Mears are eligible as both won races in 2007 for different teams.  Kyle Busch won the 2007 Food City 500 as the driver of the No. 5 team, while Mears won the 2007 Coca-Cola 600 with the No. 25 team (now the No. 88 team). Kyle Busch's No. 18 team won the 2008 Kobalt Tools 500 and 2008 Aaron's 499 and is eligible for the 2009 race as well.

≠ – Sprint All-Star Race XXIII Champion.

Race format

Sprint Showdown
The teams that have not qualified for the All-Star Race were in a 40-lap race divided into two "halves" (two 20-lap segments) with a five-lap break to allow for teams to have the option to make a pit stop. The top two drivers from this race, along with a fan ballot that selected the third (from the internet, Sprint cellular phone subscribers, Sprint retail locations, and on-site fan voting up to that night) among those on the lead lap and in the Top 50 in driver points will qualify for the main event.  The cell phone votes counted double those of the other methods. Qualifying was the standard NASCAR two-lap event, with the fastest lap counting, and Elliott Sadler winning said pole. However, during the first segment, Sadler was knocked out of the race when A. J. Allmendinger bumped him high into the Turn Two wall, and Allmendinger and Sam Hornish Jr. automatically qualified, while Kasey Kahne won the fan vote.

Sprint All-Star Race XXIV
The race format of four "quarters" (like football or professional basketball) was slightly modified this season.  In Sprint All-Star Race XXIII, the quarters were each 20 laps. This year, as announced at NASCAR's Media Tour, five laps were added to each segment to have a total of 100 laps (or four 25-lap quarters) in the race.  The remainder of the race format, adopted last year, was unchanged. The qualifying for this race is a three-lap cumulative timed event with a mandatory four-tire pit stop arriving at the pit road speed of 45 MPH but leaving as full throttle after either the first or second qualifying lap.  Kyle Busch took advantage of numerous miscues by others (including penalties for speed violations or loose lug nuts) to win the pole position. Kahne became the first to qualify from the fan vote to win, only taking a splash of gas to dominate the final quarter which, along with the rest of the race, went caution free.

Other events

The traditional skills challenge for the pit crews, the NASCAR Sprint Cup Series Pit Crew Challenge presented by Craftsman, was held on Thursday night, May 15 at Time Warner Cable Arena.  This annual skills challenge again awarded prizes to top teams and individuals for the best demonstration of pit stop skills, including the main competition, a single-elimination tournament. The Team Red Bull crew of Brian Vickers' No.83 car won the event; however, since they had not won a race in the period prior to the All-Star main event, Joe Gibbs Racing's No.11 Denny Hamlin team got the first pick of the pit box to use on pit road for the All-Star Race as they were the runner-up and had won a race. Vickers failed to even make the main event, finishing fourth in the Showdown.
A new skills challenge took place just before the green flag of the Sprint Showdown.  In the Pennzoil Victory Challenge, five drivers simulated a burnout as if they had just won a race.  The winner was determined by the fastest time traveling from the start-finish line to victory lane, deducting penalties.  Drivers were in identically prepared cars supplied by the Richard Petty Driving Experience.  Greg Biffle won $10,000, to be donated to his self-named foundation charity.  The event lineup also included Clint Bowyer, Jimmie Johnson, Kevin Harvick, and Kyle Busch.

References

NASCAR Sprint All-Star Race
Sprint All-Star Race
NASCAR races at Charlotte Motor Speedway
NASCAR All-Star Race